Vagator Beach is the northernmost beach of Bardez Taluka, Goa. It is across the Chapora River from Morjim in Pernem. To the south of Vagator is Anjuna, one of the first hippie trails of Goa.

Etymology
The name Vagator is a combination of the terms Vaga (tiger) and tir (shore), which means a tiger-infested area. Vagator used to be a densely forested area connected to the Sahyadri mountain range. According to legend, tigers searching for sweet water in the jungle would eventually find their way to the source at the foot of the hill.

Beach 
Vagator Beach has dramatic black cliff rocks  looking down on the shore.Vagator was rated one of cleanest beaches in Goa.People tend to wait long hours to witness the sunsets on the beach.

Vagator Beach is split into two main beaches by a seaside headland which holds the car park and many stalls selling trinkets, clothes, soft drinks and snacks. As you face the sea, on your right is North Vagator Beach (Big Vagator) and on your left Ozran Beach, more commonly known as Little Vagator Beach.

Vagator is a little more laid back, though still pretty much steeped in the rave culture. The tourist traffic is predominantly Western backpackers, however it has also become popular with Indian tourists, who particularly come to watch the sunset from the rocks.
The sunset through rocks is breathtaking from Vagator Beach.

There are a number of places playing to a dance & trance crowd during the tourist season.  These include: Nine Bar located just above Little Vagator, Hilltop (a little back from Little Vagator) and Primrose back towards Big Vagator beach, they play different types of trance and psychedelic music from different DJ's from around the world. Disco Valley of Vagator Beach is a place that used to be the place for Goan trance parties starting from very early 1990s. 

Also there are a number of Mediterranean and Indian Cafes/Hotels serving a variety of food and drink.

2013 saw the popular Sunburn Festival shift its base to Vagator from Candolim Beach.

Nearest towns 

Anjuna - for tourist traffic and the Wednesday Anjuna Markets

Mapusa - is the nearest town for provisions and shopping. This is where the locals shop.

Chapora - is the nearest village. In the evenings, the fishing boats come into the jetty, and locals and tourists can buy fish straight off the boats.Chapora is a well known rave area at night.It has many western type indie bars.

Tivim - is the nearest railway station.

Restaurants 

There are a number of restaurants, increasingly catering to both Western and Indian tourists. Some of these are only open in the tourist season.

Hill Top 
Hill Top in Vagator is popular for rave parties. New year tends to be the most chaotic with crowds easily in the thousands attending the party at Hilltop. Hill Top has a party every Sunday evening in the tourist season. DJs from Germany, Sweden, England, France, Italy, India, Russia and Israel are regular performers at Hill Top.

the vagator beach also has dominos and pizza hut

References

External links

Beaches of Goa
Beaches of North Goa district
Tourist attractions in North Goa district